Alexander Charles Carlile, Baron Carlile of Berriew,  (born 12 February 1948) is a British barrister and crossbench member of the House of Lords. He was the Member of Parliament (MP) for Montgomeryshire from 1983 to 1997.

Early life and career
Alex Carlile, the son of Polish Jewish immigrants, was born in Ruabon, North Wales and brought up in Lancashire. He was educated at Epsom College and at King's College London where he graduated in law in 1969. He was called to the Bar by Gray's Inn in 1970 and became a Queen's Counsel (QC) at the early age of 36.

Lord Carlile of Berriew is a company director and barrister, and former head of chambers of Foundry Chambers, London, a set of barristers' chambers. He defended Diana, Princess of Wales's butler, Paul Burrell, against charges that Burrell had stolen some of her estate's belongings. In 2001 he was appointed the independent reviewer of terrorism legislation. Carlile stood down as head of chambers at 9–12 Bell Yard in March 2008.

Carlile was appointed Commander of the Order of the British Empire (CBE) in the 2012 New Year Honours for services to national security law.

Political career
Carlile was created a life peer on 27 July 1999, as Baron Carlile of Berriew, of Berriew in the County of Powys, having previously been a Liberal Democrat Member of Parliament for Montgomeryshire from 1983 to 1997; he had stood unsuccessfully as a Liberal for East Flintshire in February and October 1974.

Lord Carlile sat as a Liberal Democrat peer until 2016 when he left the party stating that he found himself "at odds" with the party's policies on many matters including national security issues. It was reported that civil liberties, especially the so-called Snooper's Charters, were at the core of the disagreement.

According to the Register of Lords' Interests, Lord Carlile of Berriew was at various times a director of 5 Bell Yard Ltd and the Wynnstay Group of agricultural feed manufacturers, agricultural goods merchants and fuel oil distributors; a deputy High Court judge; and a chairman of the Competition Appeals Tribunal. He was president of the Howard League for Penal Reform in 2006–9.

He is an Honorary Professor in the Universities of St Andrews and Swansea, and a Fellow of King's College London. He is a Honorary Doctor of Laws in the Universities of Swansea, South Wales, Chester, Manchester Metropolitan, and the Hungarian Institute of Criminology.

Carlile is a co-director and co-owner of a strategy and political risks consultancy, SC Strategy Limited with Sir John Scarlett, the former chief of MI6.

In 2014 Carlile mounted a legal challenge to the UK travel ban on Maryam Rajavi, leader of the People's Mujahedin of Iran (MeK) and president-elect of the National Council of Resistance of Iran. The Supreme Court decided in favour of the UK government.

In 2016 Carlile sat on the founding committee of National Opposition to Windfarms, and sponsored the launch event at the Houses of Parliament.

Penal reform

From 2006 to 2013, Carlile was President of the Howard League for Penal Reform.

In 2006 he was chairman of the Carlile Inquiry into the use of force on children in custody. In 2011, Lord Carlile held a follow-up hearing in the House of Lords. He put together an expert panel who gave both written and oral evidence.

Legislation
Carlile was the first Member of Parliament to campaign for the rights of transgender people.

Lord Carlile acted from 2001 to 2011 as the UK's Independent Reviewer of Terrorism Legislation.  He was succeeded by David Anderson QC. The Director of Liberty, Shami Chakrabarti, called Carlile's support for control orders "disappointing" in a February 2006 press release condemning the introduction of control orders by the Prevention of Terrorism Act 2005. In 2015, he joined with a cross-party group of peers to reintroduce the Draft Communications Data Bill, known by its opponents as the "Snoopers' Charter". He was an independent reviewer on the 2015 Assessment on Paramilitary Groups in Northern Ireland.

He was vocal in his opposition to the UK coalition government's Legal Aid, Sentencing and Punishment of Offenders Bill, proposing many amendments. He was one of five Lords who vehemently opposed the introduction of means testing for police advice (to cover the cost of lawyers consulting suspects in police stations). "A single moment of reflection leaves one open-mouthed at the absurdity of this proposal," he said.

He was initially appointed to lead the independent review of the UK government's Prevent programme but resigned after a legal challenge was mounted against his appointment.

Personal life
He lists his recreations as politics, theatre, food and football, and is a member of the Athenaeum Club. He is a lifelong supporter of English football club Burnley FC. He is a Fellow of the Royal Society of Arts, Patron of The Security Institute, and Patron (previously Chairman) of the Chartered Security Professionals Registration Authority. He has three children by his first wife Frances and nine grandchildren. He married his second wife, Alison Levitt QC, in December 2007. She is a member of the London barristers' chambers, 2 Hare Court.

Carlile is a Bencher of Gray's Inn.

On 11 July 2018, Carlile (after being granted a visa) was refused entry to India at Indira Gandhi International Airport where he was due to address a press conference in defence of jailed Bangladeshi politician Khaleda Zia and meet a human rights body. India's foreign ministry said his "intended activity in India was incompatible with the purpose of his visit as mentioned in his visa application", though media reported the decision to refuse him entry was a political one to protect India-Bangladesh relations.

See also
 Timeline of children's rights in the United Kingdom

References

External links
 
Howard League for Penal Reform
Lord Carlile speaking about the effectiveness of the House of Commons and about the Rule of Law at a seminar organised by The Constitution Society
Lord Carlile of Berriew QC profile at the site of Liberal Democrats
Biography at the House of Lords Biography at the House of Lords]
Announcement of his introduction at the House of Lords House of Lords minutes of proceedings, 12 October 1999

1948 births
Living people
People from Ruabon
People educated at Epsom College
Alumni of King's College London
Associates of King's College London
Fellows of King's College London
English Jews
English people of Polish-Jewish descent
English barristers
English King's Counsel
Jewish British politicians
Liberal Party (UK) MPs for Welsh constituencies
Liberal Democrats (UK) MPs for Welsh constituencies
Liberal Democrats (UK) life peers
Members of Gray's Inn
UK MPs 1983–1987
UK MPs 1987–1992
UK MPs 1992–1997
Commanders of the Order of the British Empire
Life peers created by Elizabeth II